The West Region Tribal Council is a tribal council in Manitoba, acting as a coordinating body for eight band governments representing around 9,000 members in total.

Member bands
The eight band governments that comprise the tribal council are the:
Ebb and Flow First Nation — at Ebb and Flow, Manitoba
Gamblers First Nation — Binscarth, Manitoba
Keeseekoowenin First Nation — Elphinstone, Manitoba
O-Chi-Chak-Ko-Sipi First Nation — Crane River, Manitoba
Pine Creek First Nation — Camperville, Manitoba
Rolling River First Nation — Erickson, Manitoba
Skownan First Nation — Skownan, Manitoba
Tootinaowaziibeeng Treaty Reserve — Shortdale, Manitoba

References

 
First Nations governments in Manitoba